Rafika Marzouk (رفيقة مرزوق), born 27 October 1979 in Sousse, is a Tunisian handball player. She plays as captain at right wing for Nantes Loire Atlantique Handball in the top division of the French league Championnat de France de handball féminin  and in the Tunisian national team.

Marzouk played for Tunisia in the African Women's Handball Championships in 2010 and 2012 in which the team was runner-up, and in 2014 in which it won the tournament.

She also played for Tunisia at the World Women's Handball Championship in 2011 in Brazil.

Play history 
Marzouk's play history:

References

1979 births
Living people
Tunisian female handball players